Kramer Reid Robertson (born September 20, 1994) is an American professional baseball infielder in the St. Louis Cardinals organization. He has played in Major League Baseball (MLB) for the Cardinals. He made his MLB debut in 2022. Before his professional career, Robertson attended Louisiana State University (LSU) and played college baseball for the LSU Tigers.

Early life
Robertson was born in Ruston, Louisiana. He moved to Waco in 2000. His mother, Kim Mulkey, played college basketball for Louisiana Tech University and the United States women's national basketball team and is the head coach for LSU's women's basketball team. His father, Randy, played college football for Louisiana Tech.

Amateur career
Robertson attended Midway High School in Waco, Texas. He starred in baseball, football, and basketball at Midway. As a senior, he batted .425 with five home runs. After graduating, he enrolled at Louisiana State University (LSU), where he played college baseball for the LSU Tigers. 

Robertson started 30 games at second base as a freshman, but batted .200 with one home run and 20 RBIs. He batted .232 as a sophomore. In 2014 and 2015, he played collegiate summer baseball with the Wareham Gatemen of the Cape Cod Baseball League, where he was named a league all-star in 2014. During his junior year, he moved to shortstop. He batted .324 with two home runs, 39 RBIs, 20 doubles, and 14 stolen bases as a junior in 2016, and was named to the All-Southeastern Conference team and Collegiate Baseballs All-American team. The Cleveland Indians selected Robertson in the 32nd round of the 2016 MLB draft, but he did not sign, turning down a $250,000 signing bonus so that he could return to LSU for his senior year. As a senior, he batted .307 with eight home runs, 43 RBIs, 18 doubles, and 85 runs scored.

Professional career

St. Louis Cardinals
The St. Louis Cardinals selected Robertson in the fourth round of the 2017 MLB draft. He signed with the Cardinals, and made his professional debut for the Peoria Chiefs. He spent the whole season with Peoria, batting .270 with three home runs, 13 RBIs, and ten stolen bases in 54 games. Robertson spent 2018 with the Palm Beach Cardinals where he compiled a .252 batting average with two home runs, 37 RBIs, and 15 stolen bases in 121 games.

Robertson began the 2019 season with the Springfield Cardinals, and also spent time with the Memphis Redbirds. Over 123 games between the two clubs, he slashed .231/.360/.365 with 11 home runs, 51 RBI, and 14 stolen bases. He was selected to play in the Arizona Fall League for the Glendale Desert Dogs following the season. Robertson did not play in a minor league game in 2020 due to the cancellation of the season as a result of the COVID-19 pandemic. Robertson played for Memphis in 2021 and began the season with Memphis in 2022.

On May 10, 2022, the Cardinals promoted Robertson to the major leagues. He made his MLB debut that night as a pinch runner. He was designated for assignment on June 3.

Atlanta Braves
On June 5, Robertson was claimed off of waivers by the Atlanta Braves. He was then optioned to the Triple-A Gwinnett Stripers.

New York Mets
The New York Mets claimed Robertson off of waivers from the Braves on June 27, 2022. Robertson was designated for assignment by the Mets on August 3.

St. Louis Cardinals (second stint)
On August 5, 2022, the St. Louis Cardinals claimed Robertson off of waivers from the Mets. He was outrighted off the roster on November 1, 2022.

Personal life
Robertson has an older sister, Makenzie, who played college basketball at Baylor.

References

External links

LSU Tigers bio

1994 births
Living people
Sportspeople from Ruston, Louisiana
Sportspeople from Waco, Texas
Baseball players from Louisiana
Baseball players from Texas
Major League Baseball infielders
St. Louis Cardinals players
LSU Tigers baseball players
Wareham Gatemen players
Peoria Chiefs players
Palm Beach Cardinals players
Springfield Cardinals players
Memphis Redbirds players
Glendale Desert Dogs players
Gwinnett Stripers players